The following is a list of ice hockey teams in British Columbia, past and present. It includes the league(s) they play for, and championships won.

Major Professional

National Hockey League

Pacific Coast Hockey Association

Western Canada Hockey League

World Hockey Association

Minor Professional

American Hockey League

ECHL

Pacific Coast Hockey League

Western Hockey League (minor pro)

Senior

Okanagan Mainline League

Okanagan Senior League

Pacific Coast Senior League

Western International Hockey League

West Kootenay League

Major Junior

Western Hockey League

Current teams

Former teams

Junior A

British Columbia Hockey League

Junior B

Midget AAA

Vancouver Island Hockey League

Current teams

Semi-professional, senior and amateur

Western Women's Hockey League

National Women's Hockey League

Senior Female AAA SCFAHL / BCAHA

Senior

University
Only one British Columbia university competes in ice hockey in the Canada West Universities Athletic Association.

College
The following teams play in the British Columbia Intercollegiate Hockey League.

League, regional and national championships

See also

British Columbia Amateur Hockey Association
2006 World Junior Ice Hockey Championships

References

British Columbia teams
 
Ice hockey teams
Ice hockey teams in British Columbia